The following is a list of diesel locomotives produced by FAUR, Romania, that include diesel–electric, diesel hydraulic, and diesel–mechanical locomotives.

For Romanian Railways
Romanian Railways CFR's diesel locomotives built by FAUR Bucharest are classes 64 to 95.

Diesel–electric

Diesel-hydraulic

Diesel–mechanical

For Bulgarian State Railways
 BDŽ class 55
 BDŽ class 76
 BDŽ class 77

For Czechoslovak State Railways

 ČD Class 706.42
 ČD Class 748.45
 ČD Class 748.47
 ČD Class 748.5

For Deutsche Reichsbahn

 DR Class 119 (219) Class

For Hungarian State Railways
 MÁV M43 Class (wiki article in German and in Hungarian)
 MÁV M47 Class (wiki article in German and in Hungarian)
 MÁV Mk45 Class (wiki article in Hungarian)

For Polish State Railways

 MBxd2 Class

Demonstrator for United States
 LDH125 "Quarterhorse" (diesel-hydraulic 1974-1980s)

See also
 List of stock used by Romanian Railways
 List of Electroputere locomotives

References

External links

Romanian locomotives photo gallery

FAUR locomotives
FAUR locomotives
Locomotives of Romania